Hugh Raymond Phillips (8 April 1929 – 2018) was an English cricketer. Phillips was a right-handed batsman. He was born at Kuala Lumpur in what was then British Malaya, now Malaysia.

Phillips made a single first-class appearance for Warwickshire against Scotland at Edgbaston in 1951.  Scotland won the toss and elected to bat in their first-innings, making 359 all out. In response, Warwickshire made 332 all out, with Phillips scoring 3 runs at number five, before he was dismissed by Samuel Thomson. This was his only first-class batting innings, with the match being declared a draw.

He died in 2018 in New Zealand.

References

External links
Hugh Phillips at ESPNcricinfo
Hugh Phillips at CricketArchive

1929 births
2018 deaths
Sportspeople from Kuala Lumpur
English cricketers
Warwickshire cricketers